The Rivian R1T is a mid-size electric light duty luxury pickup truck produced by the American company Rivian. The first production R1T rolled off the assembly line in Illinois and was delivered to a customer in September 2021. The official EPA range for the Rivian R1T is 314 miles (505 km).

History

Rivian unveiled the upcoming truck under the working name A1T in May 2018 but rebadged the vehicle in November 2018 as the R1T. These design objectives were largely achieved in the 2021 production vehicle release.
Rivian said it was designing the vehicles to facilitate "car-sharing" with their autonomous features.

In 2018, Rivian stated it intended to license its electric chassis to other manufacturers as a design base for machinery such as cars and other components.
As of 2018, Rivian stated it planned to begin production of the R1T in 2020.

In March 2021, Rivian announced plans to develop a network of public charging stations by 2023. Similar to competitor Tesla, they plan to eventually offer a combination of fast chargers and slower destination chargers, while also selling home chargers. The target is for 600 Rivian-only Adventure Network sites with 3,500DC fast chargers at high-traffic locations; 200kW will be the initial charging speed, with an eventual target of 300kW.
, the company is planning 10,000 destination chargers (Level 2, 11.5kW) — called Rivian Waypoints — at retail, lodging, and dining businesses, as well as parks and other locations; Waypoint chargers are slated to be available to all EVs with a J1772 connector. Starting July 2021, Rivian will install, at no cost to the government, two Rivian Waypoint chargers at up to 50 Colorado State Parks and state recreation areas.

In the summer of 2021, journalists from MotorTrend became the first to cross the Trans America Trail in an electric vehicle—on a  journey covering terrain including rocks, mud, gravel and sand—using a stock R1T pre-production version of the truck.

In September 2021, the first customer vehicle rolled off the production line and was delivered to a customer.
The Rivian R1T was initially offered with three different batteries sized 105 kWh, 135 kWh, and 180 kWh of energy storage. Rivian R1T will have a range of 230 miles with the smallest battery, 314 miles for the medium battery, and over 400 miles for the largest battery. Additional batteries can be mounted in the R1T's bed for improved range. Those backup/auxiliary batteries can be charged by another R1T, if no charging infrastructure is available.

According to Car and Driver magazine the real world range with a 129 kWh battery range of  highway driving, depending on tire choice.

Rivian began delivering the first R1T trucks to customers in October 2021.

Design and specifications

The Rivian R1T is an all-electric, battery-powered, Individual wheel drive light duty pickup truck The vehicle features four electric motors, one on each wheel, that combine to produce  and deliver  of torque.

Drivetrain:
direct-drive transaxles from the centrally-mounted four motors
torque vectoring wheel control, senses slip on each wheel with millisecond granularity, "distributes the proper amount of power to each wheel, precisely as needed." 
Suspension: "sophisticated suspension architecture" with dynamic roll control: 
ride-height adjustable air suspension:  of wheel travel allows for ride height of 
front: adaptive dampers, unequal-length double-wishbone suspension 
rear: adaptive dampers, multi-link suspension
 Length:  Width:  (with mirrors folded) Height: 
 Gross vehicle weight:  at maximum payload of 
 Acceleration:  time of 3.0 seconds.  Top speed 
 Regenerative braking: up to 0.21 g. Charges the battery with energy dissipated during braking.
 Balance: 51/49 front-rear weight distribution
 Range:  with the standard 135 kWh "Large pack" battery pack.  with the optional 180 kWh "Max pack" (available 2023)
 Battery pack: 7,776 cells (2170 type) in a nine-module assembly for the 135 kWh battery pack. The Li-ion cells are manufactured by Samsung; battery pack is assembled by Rivian in Normal, Illinois. A flashlight is available on the driver-side door containing a Li-ion cell identical to the cells used in the main battery, bringing the total cell count in the vehicle to 7,777.
 Electrical outlets: dual 15A/120V AC outlets in the cargo bed; single 15A/120V AC outlet in the frunk and another in the gear tunnel.
 Hardware readiness for assisted driving: 11 cameras, 12 ultrasonic sensors, 5 radar sensors
 The R1T can charge at up to 225 kW and supports Plug&Charge.
Interior display size:  driver cluster plus a  main infotainment/navigation/climate/comfort display in the center of dashboard.
Coefficient of Drag: 0.30

The chassis includes braking, suspension, and cooling systems with a battery in the center.
Rivian's relatively flat, low center of gravity chassis is a typical electric vehicle skateboard, which enables straightforward modification by the manufacturer for other body types.

Rivian has applied for a patent on a novel tight-turning technique where differential motor torque between the turned front wheels and back wheels is applied.  Previously referred to as "Tank Turn" mode, the software to support the feature was not ready and so is not included in the initial production trucks in late 2021.

Storage and towing 

The Class V tow hitch is hidden behind a removable panel.

The "frunk" — located where the engine would be in a internal-combustion-engine-powered truck — offers  of additional cargo space, and contains 12 V DC outlets, a 15A/120V AC outlet, and a drain.

Another storage compartment is the  -long Gear Tunnel, which runs the width of the truck and can be used for storing sports equipment or a number of available accessories.  It also has a 12 V DC outlet and a 15A/120V AC outlet.

Off-road driving and overlanding 
Approach, departure, breakover angles are 35.5, 30 and 26.4 degrees respectively. Custom made Pirelli 275/65 R20 all-terrain tires are available as an option.

Custom drive modes—which adjust the suspension, ride-height, throttle and steering—include "All-Purpose, Sport, Conserve, Tow and Off-Road", plus sub modes for off-road that include "Rock Crawl, Soft Sand and Rally."

Rivian is offering vehicle options for off roading: a reinforced underbody shield with tow hooks, a "camp kitchen"—two induction cooking elements (1440W each, Dometic CI20), a sink, plus 30 pieces of outdoor cooking/dining equipment—that collapses into the R1T gear tunnel, as well as a roof-top tent for three. A winch is available as an option and can be controlled via Rivian's iOS app.

Hands-free driving 
R1T has safety and driver assistance package called the Driver+. On selected highways the truck is capable of self-steering and controlling speed following the instructions of the driver similar to Tesla's AutoPilot. During hands-free driving the driver has to keep their eyes on road and Rivian R1T has cameras inside the cabin to monitor the driver's activity. The hands-free feature works well in straight roads but needs driver's input when taking corners.

Awards
The Rivian R1T was awarded the 2022 Truck of the Year by Motor Trend.

See also
 Rivian R1S, an electric SUV sharing most of its components with the R1T
 Ford F-150 Lightning electric pickup
 Chevrolet Silverado EV
 GMC Hummer EV
 GMC Sierra EV
 Tesla Cybertruck

Notes

References

External links

 

Electric trucks
Pickup trucks
Production electric cars
Rivian vehicles
Rivian trucks and vans
First car made by manufacturer